Lathen is a municipality in the Emsland district, in Lower Saxony, Germany. It is the location of the Emsland Transrapid Test facility, a testing site for Transrapid maglev trains.

See also
2006 Lathen maglev train accident

References

Emsland